Robert Ferguson ( – 19 May 1915) was a Scottish professional golfer who was one of the top players from the mid-1860s into the 1880s. He won a hat-trick of consecutive titles at The Open Championship in 1880, 1881 and 1882.

In addition to the three Open Championship wins, he posted top-10 finishes seven times.

Early life
Ferguson was born in Musselburgh, East Lothian, Scotland, circa 1846.

Golf career
In addition to his three Open Championship titles, Ferguson was especially noted for his putting, not only on the green but off. He specialized in "run up" shots with his putter—the so-called "Musselburgh iron"—from well off the green. He is one of only four men who have won The Open three years in a row. The prize for his first win was £7.

Ferguson's home town of Musselburgh was one of the three venues in the Open Championship rotation. He started caddying there at the age of eight, and played his first competition at Leith when he was 18. He was a tall man, and was known as a long driver. He sometimes partnered with fellow Musselburgh top player Willie Park Sr., a four-time Open champion, in stakes matches, facing opponents such as the father-and-son team of Old Tom Morris and Young Tom Morris, of St. Andrews, between the mid-1860s and mid-1870s. Both of the Morrises were four-time Open champions. He also faced Young Tom Morris in singles play during this era. His playing career was cut short by a bout of typhoid, and he became the custodian of the Links at Musselburgh.

Death and legacy
Ferguson died in Musselburgh on 19 May 1915.

Major championships

Wins (3)

Results timeline

Note: Ferguson played only in The Open Championship.
NT = No tournament
DNP = Did not play
"T" indicates a tie for a place
Green background for wins. Yellow background for top-10

References

Scottish male golfers
Winners of men's major golf championships
Golfers from Musselburgh
1846 births
1915 deaths